Samina Chowdhury (born 28 August 1966) is a Bangladeshi singer. She mostly sings modern and classical songs. Her notable songs include Jonmo Theke Jolchi Mago, Amar Buker Moddhyekhane, Amar Dui Chokhe Dui Nodi, Ekbar Jodi Keu, Kobita Porar Prohor and Phool Phote Phool Jhore.

Early life
Chowdhury was born to Mahmudun Nabi & Rashida Chowdhury. She has 2 sisters named Fahmida Nabi & Tanzida Nabi and has 1 brother named Ridwan Nabi Pancham. As a child, she went to Agrani School and College in Dhaka. Chowdhury's sister, Fahmida Nabi, and brother Pancham are also musicians. Under guidance from her father, she developed as a playback contemporary singer. She took part in Notun Kuri song category and stood first in this competition in 1977.

Career
Chowdhury started her career as a playback singer in 1981. Her debut song was Jonmo Theke Jolchi Mago from the film Jonmo Theke Jolchi. She continued working as a singer in the audio industry. Later, she sang the song "Saat Bhai Champa Jagore" in the film "Saat Bhai Champa". Then she took a hiatus from playback singing. She concentrated on studio albums and released songs named Kobita Porar Prohor Eseche, Ekbar Jodi Keu Bhalobasto and Oi Jhinuk Phota Sagorbelay.

Chowdhury returned to playback singing through the song "Tomar Gorur Garite Ami Jabo Na", a duet with Andrew Kishore. Another rendition was "Amar Buker Moddhyekhane". Some of her repertoire are Door Deepobasini, Hou Jodi Oi Neel Akash, "Hridoye Likhechi Tomari Naam" and Amar Majhe Nei Ekhon Ami. Her non-playback career includes adhunik song and Rabindra Sangeet. Some of her modern songs are Oi Jhinuk Phota Sagorbelay, Amar Icche Kore, Kobita Porar Prohor Eseche Rater Nirjone, Somoy Jeno Kate Na, Phool Phote Phool Jhore etc.  She also released a Rabindra Sangeet album in 2009. She has sung two songs in the film Niswartha Bhalobasa : "Jamunar Jol" (with S I Tutul) and "Shopno Shopno".

Chowdhury acted in radio dramas - Julius Caesar and Ei Shei. She also used to be a news anchor.

Chowdhury performs as a playback singer for film scores. She won Bangladesh National Film Award for Best Female Playback Singer (2006), Bachsas Award for Best Female Singer (1981) and Meril Prothom Alo Award for Best Female Singer (2005). Her father is famous music personality late Mahmudunnabi and sister famous artist Fahmida Nabi. In the year 2007, she served as judge of "Sera Kantha" held at Channel I. She also served as the judge of Channel i 's "Khude Gun Raj", NTV's "CloseUp1", "Valobashi Bangladesh" of Maasranga Television and other programs.

Collaborations
During her career, Chowdhury has collaborated with many singers of Bangladesh. She played duets with Asif Akbar, Habib Wahid, Subir Nandi, Andrew Kishore, S. D. Rubel, S.I. Tutul, Monir Khan, Bappa Mazumder, Agun etc. She has worked with music directors and lyricists including Ahmed Imtiaz Bulbul, Ali Akbar Rupu, Sheikh Sadi Khan, Alam Khan, Alauddin Ali, Khan Ataur Rahman, Shawkat Ali Emon, Kabir Bakul, S.I. Tutul, Habib Wahid and Bappa Mazumder.

Discography

Studio albums
She has sung in 15 studio albums

Notable songs
 "Somoy Jeno Kate Na" written by renowned lyricist Shahid Mahmud Jangi
"Phool Phote Phool Jhore" written by renowned lyricist Shahid Mahmud Jangi
Jonmo Theke Jolchi Mago
 Amar Duichokhe
 Amar Buker Moddhyekhane
 Phool Phote Phool Jhore
 Ekbar Jodi Keu
 Amar Majhe Nei
 Kobita Porar Prohor
 Ami Anutapta
 Ekbar Jodi Keu
 Bondhu Amar

Film songs

Television songs

Reality show judge 
In the year 2007, Samina Chowdhury served as judge of "Sera Kantha" held at Channel I. She also served as the judge of Channel i 's "Khude Gun Raj", NTV's "CloseUp1", "Valobashi Bangladesh" of Maasranga Television.

Television appearance
 Drama - Midnight Black Coffee aired on NTV

Radio program 
Samina Chowdhury took part in "Julius Caesar" and "Ei shei" radio drama. She also worked as a news presenter.

Awards
National Film Awards
 Best Female Playback Singer - 2006
Bachsas Awards
 Best Female Singer - 1981
Meril Prothom Alo Awards

References

Living people
Place of birth missing (living people)
Bangladeshi playback singers
21st-century Bangladeshi women singers
21st-century Bangladeshi singers
20th-century Bangladeshi women singers
20th-century Bangladeshi singers
Laser Vision artists
Best Female Playback Singer National Film Award (Bangladesh) winners
Best Female Singer Bachsas Award winners
Best Female Singer Meril-Prothom Alo Award winners
1966 births